Kâhta (Ottoman Turkish: کولک  / Kölük) is a city in Adıyaman Province of Turkey. It is the seat of Kâhta District. Its population is 86,232 (2021). The city is populated by Kurds from the Reşwan tribe.

Notable people 

 Dengir Mir Mehmet Fırat (1943-2019), Kurdish politician who was one of the founders of the Justice and Development Party (AKP) in 2001
 Ahmet Aydın (*1971), Kurdish Politician
 Mehmet Yavuz (1973-2019), Kurdish politician and teacher in Turkey who led the Kurdish Islamist Free Cause Party from May 2018 until 7 October 2018

References

Kâhta District
Populated places in Adıyaman Province
Kurdish settlements in Adıyaman Province